Rotzo   is a town in the province of Vicenza, Veneto, northern-eastern Italy. It is east of SP350 road, and is part of the Sette Comuni plateau.

References

External links
(Google Maps)

Cities and towns in Veneto